The Unspoken Heard is the hip-hop collaborative of rapper Asheru and producer Blue Black. It is often referred to as Asheru & Blue Black of the Unspoken Heard. They began getting significant recognition in underground hip-hop around the turn of the millennium. Their sound is reminiscent of the New York "new school" sound of the early 1990s, particularly that of the Native Tongues Posse.

Asheru's profile and popularity has increased due to his intro and outro theme music for the animated series The Boondocks on Adult Swim.

Discography

Albums
 Soon Come (LP) (2001) Seven Heads
 48 Months (LP) (2003)  Seven Heads

EPs
 Cosmology (EP) (1997) Seven Heads
 Jamboree (1999) Seven Heads

References
 [ Allmusic.com artist page]

External links
 Asheru's page at MySpace - features free downloads of his music
 DC area hiphop page

American hip hop groups
Hip hop duos
American musical duos